Imad (also transliterated as Emad, Imed and Aimad ) is an Arabic masculine given name and surname and means "support" or "pillar".

Given name
 Imād ad-Dīn Muhammad bin Qasim, Umayyad Caliphate general 
 Imad Abbas, Palestinian military commander
 Imad Baba, American soccer player
 Emad Hajjaj, Jordanian political cartoonist
 Emad al-Janabi, Iraqi blacksmith 
 Imad Khalili, Swedish footballer
 Imad Khamis, Syrian politician
 Imad Kotbi, Moroccan radio presenter
 Emad Mohammed, Iraqi footballer
 Imad Rahman, Pakistani American fiction writer
 Imad Rami, Syrian Nasheed singer
 Imad Wasim, Pakistani international cricketer
 Imad Feghaly, Lebanese actor and voice actor
 Imad Abullah Sarah, Syrian politician

Imed
 Imed Abdelnabbi (born 1957), Egyptian chess player
 Imed Louati (born 1993), Tunisian footballer
 Imed Memmich (born 1966), Tunisian scholar and politician
 Imed Meniaoui (born 1983), Tunisian footballer
 Imed Mhedhebi (born 1976), Tunisian footballer
 Imed Ketata, Tunisian footballer
 Imed Trabelsi (born 1974), Tunisian businessman and politician
 Imed Ben Younes (born 1974), Tunisian former football player and current coach

Surname
 Mitra Emad, American anthropologist
 Parvis Emad, American philosopher and Professor Emeritus of Philosophy at DePaul University

Family origin 

The Imad family is named for al-Amadiyyah, near Mosul in northern Iraq and, like the Jumblatt family, is thought to be of Kurdish origin.

Some unconfirmed sources allege that the roots of Family Imad ancestors are associated with those of Imad ad-Din Zengi (1087; † 1146), who was in turn the Atabeg of Mosul from 1127 to his death in 1146.

Imad as a family name also indicates descent from the originally Druze feudal family Al-Imad in the Chouf region of Mount Lebanon.

References 

Arabic masculine given names